The 2004 Canadian federal election was held on June 28, 2004, to elect members to the House of Commons of Canada of the 38th Parliament of Canada. The Liberal government of Prime Minister Paul Martin lost its majority but was able to continue in office as a minority government after the election. This was the first election contested by the newly amalgamated Conservative Party of Canada, after it was formed by the two right-of-centre parties, the Progressive Conservative Party and the Canadian Alliance.

On May 23, 2004, the governor general, Adrienne Clarkson, on the advice of Martin, ordered the dissolution of the House of Commons, triggering an early election despite the Liberals being only three and a half years into their five-year mandate. Earlier, the election result was widely expected to be a fourth consecutive majority government for the Liberals, but early in 2004 Liberal popularity fell sharply due to the emerging details of the sponsorship scandal. Polls even started to indicate the possibility of a Conservative minority government. In the end, the Liberals won a minority government, though they were well short of a majority and lost nearly three dozen seats.

On election day, polling times were arranged to allow results from most provinces to be announced more or less simultaneously, with the exception of Atlantic Canada, whose results were known before the close of polling in other provinces due to the British Columbia Supreme Court's decision in R v Bryan.

Major political parties

Liberal Party of Canada 

Until the sponsorship scandal, most pundits were predicting that new Prime Minister Paul Martin would lead the Liberal Party of Canada to a fourth majority government, possibly setting a record for number of seats won.

However, polls released immediately after the scandal broke showed Liberal support down as much as 10% nationwide, with greater declines in its heartland of Quebec and Ontario. Although there was some recovery in Ontario and Atlantic Canada, Liberal hopes of making unprecedented gains in the west faded. The unpopularity of some provincial Liberal parties may also have had an effect on federal Liberal fortunes. In Ontario, for instance, the provincial Liberal government introduced an unpopular budget the week of the expected election call, and their federal counterparts then fell into a statistical dead heat with the Conservatives in polls there. The Liberals were also harmed by high-profile party infighting that had been plaguing the party since Martin's earlier ejection from Cabinet by now-former Prime Minister Jean Chrétien.

Conservative Party of Canada

In the final months of 2003, the Progressive Conservatives and the Canadian Alliance were running a distant third and fourth, respectively, in public opinion polls.

Many pundits predicted that the combination of the popular and fiscally conservative Martin, along with continued vote-splitting on the right, could have led to the almost total annihilation of the Progressive Conservatives and Canadian Alliance. This fear prompted those two parties to form a united Conservative Party of Canada, which was approved by the members of the Canadian Alliance on December 5, 2003, and controversially by the delegates of the Progressive Conservatives on December 6, 2003.

The new Conservative Party pulled well ahead of the NDP in the polls just before the election, although its support remained below the combined support that the Progressive Conservatives and the Alliance had as separate parties. On March 20, the Conservatives elected Stephen Harper as their new leader.

The Conservatives gained more ground in polls after Harper became leader, and the poll results in the weeks before the election had them within one to two points of the Liberals, sometimes ahead, sometimes behind them. Party supporters hoped that the voters would react negatively to the Liberal attacks on what they called Harper's "hidden agenda", and that anger over the sponsorship scandal and other Liberal failures would translate to success at the polls.

Late in the campaign, the Conservatives began to lose some momentum, in part due to remarks made by MPs. Scott Reid, the party's language critic, said that the policy of official bilingualism was unrealistic and needed to be reformed. Rob Merrifield, health critic, suggested that women ought to have mandatory family counseling before they choose to have an abortion. Randy White was quoted as saying "to heck with the courts" in reference to Reference Re Same-Sex Marriage, suggesting the party would overturn same-sex marriage. Cheryl Gallant drew controversy when she compared abortion to the beheading of Iraq War hostage Nick Berg, and called for the repeal of recently amended hate laws that include sexual orientation as one of the protected groups. Additionally, the Liberal Party began airing controversial TV ads.  Harper was also criticized for his position supporting the American-led 2003 invasion of Iraq.  The term "hidden agenda", used commonly in the 2000 election to refer to Stockwell Day, began surfacing with increasing regularity with regard to Harper's history of supporting privatized health care. Further damaging the Conservative campaign was a press release from Conservative headquarters that suggested that Paul Martin supported child pornography.  The momentum began to swing against his party, although some polls suggested it was neck and neck right up until election day.

Although on the eve of the election the party was polling slightly ahead of the Liberals everywhere west of Quebec, it had dropped in support, polling behind or on par with Liberals everywhere except the West (Alberta, British Columbia, Saskatchewan, and Manitoba), where it held onto its traditional support.

All together the new Conservatives fell from the combined Canadian Alliance-Progressive Conservative vote in 2000 of 37%, to only 29% of the vote, yet still gained 21 extra seats, finishing in second-place with 99 seats.

New Democratic Party 

Before the announcement of the union of the right-of-centre parties, some were predicting that the New Democratic Party (Canada) would form the official opposition because the NDP was polling ahead of both right-of-centre parties.  A new leader (Jack Layton) and clear social democratic policies helped revitalize the NDP. Polls suggested that the NDP had returned to the 18% to 20% level of support it enjoyed in the 1984 election and 1988 election. Layton suggested that the NDP would break their previous record of 43 seats won under former leader Ed Broadbent.

The NDP focused the campaign on winning ridings in Canada's urban centres, hoping especially to win seats in central Toronto, Hamilton, Ottawa and Winnipeg. The party's platform was built to cater to these regions and much of Layton's time was spent in these areas.

The campaign stumbled early when Layton blamed the deaths of homeless people on Paul Martin, prompting the Liberals to accuse the NDP of negative campaigning. The NDP benefited from the decline in Liberal support, but not to the same extent as the Conservatives. There was an increasing prospect that NDP voters would switch to the Liberals to block a Conservative government. This concern did not manifest itself in the polls, however, and the NDP remained at somewhat below 20 percent mark in the polls for most of the campaign.

The NDP achieved 15% of the popular vote, its highest in 16 years. However, it only won 19 seats in the House of Commons, two less than the 21 won in 1997, and far short of the 40 predicted. There was criticism that Layton's focus on urban issues and gay rights marginalized the party's traditional emphasis on the poor, the working class, and rural Canadians. Long-time MP Lorne Nystrom and several other incumbents from the Prairie provinces were defeated, with the NDP being shut out of Saskatchewan for the first time since 1965. Layton won his own seat in a tight race, while Broadbent was returned to Parliament after many years of absence.

Bloc Québécois 
The Bloc Québécois (BQ) had managed their best showing back in 1993, but they lost seats to the Liberals in 1997 and 2000, prompting pundits to suggest a decline in support for Quebec sovereignty. The Bloc continued to slide in the polls in most of 2003 after the election of the federalist Quebec Liberal Party at the National Assembly of Quebec under Jean Charest, and during the long run-up to Paul Martin becoming leader of the federal Liberals.

However, things progressively changed during 2003, partly because of the decline in popularity of the Liberal Party of Quebec government of Jean Charest, and partly because support for independence in Quebec rose again (49% in March). The tide took its sharp turn when, in February 2004, the sponsorship scandal (uncovered in considerable part by the Bloc) hit the Liberal federal government.

These events led to a resurgence of the BQ, putting it ahead of the pack once again: according to an Ipsos-Reid poll carried out for The Globe and Mail and CTV between the June 4 and 8, 50% of Quebecers intended to vote for the BQ against 24% for the Liberals.

Speculation was ongoing about the possibility of the Bloc forming alliances with other opposition parties or with an eventual minority government to promote its goals of social democracy and respect of the autonomy of provinces. Leader Gilles Duceppe stated that the Bloc, as before, would co-operate with other opposition parties or with the government when interests were found to be in common, but that the Bloc would not participate in a coalition government.

Green Party of Canada 
The Greens ran candidates in all 308 ridings for the first time in its history. The party won twice as many votes in this election than it had over the previous 21 years of its history combined, although it failed to win a seat. It also spent more money than in the previous 21 years, and although much of this money was borrowed, the Greens' share of the popular vote enabled them to receive federal funding.

Campaign slogans 

These are the official slogans for the 2004 campaigns. The optional parts of the mottos (sometimes not used for efficiency) are put in brackets.

Issues 
Important issues in the election:
Sponsorship scandal: badly hurt the Liberals in the polls and the theme of widespread corruption was used by all opposition parties, especially the Bloc.
Health care: all parties support Canada's government-administered health care system but acknowledge that improvements must be made to meet new demographic challenges and to reduce long wait times. Transfer payments to the provinces have been cut substantially to 16% by the federal Liberal government and it was difficult for Paul Martin to reconcile these cuts with his plan to improve the system.
Fiscal imbalance: all major parties except the Liberals claimed that there was a monetary imbalance between Ottawa and the provinces and spoke of plans to reduce it, the Bloc Québécois probably being the strongest denouncer of the situation.
Taxation: for the Conservatives, significantly lowering taxes, to stimulate the economy, was a central issue. The Conservatives also promised to end "corporate welfare" and replace it with tax cuts for all businesses. The Liberals, Communist Party and NDP opposed large tax cuts and argued that money should instead be spent to improve social programs.
Child care: The Liberals and NDP promised national child care programs.
Parliamentary reform: The Conservatives accused the Liberals of perpetuating "undemocratic practices" in Parliament, by limiting the powers of MPs. Martin called for some reform, but not to the satisfaction of the Conservatives. The Conservatives promised an elected Senate and standing committee and provincial review of judicial appointments. The NDP spoke of abolishing the Senate.
Electoral reform: Conservatives promised fixed election dates. The NDP promoted the idea of proportional representation voting.
Same-sex marriage: The Bloc Québécois and the NDP strongly favoured same sex marriage. The NDP considers it a human rights issue, and requires its MPs to either support legislation favouring same-sex marriage or abstain on such questions. The Bloc, on the other hand, treats it as a matter of conscience, allowing its members free votes on the issue. The Liberals sent the issue to be ruled upon by the Supreme Court, and the Liberal caucus was publicly divided on the issue. The majority of Conservative candidates opposed it; the Conservative party's official stance was for the issue to be resolved by a free vote in the Commons.
National Missile Defence: the Bush administration in the U.S. wanted Canada to join the missile shield. The Conservatives strongly supported such a plan while the Bloc and the NDP opposed it. Although the Liberals reiterated past opposition to the weaponization of space, they did not have an expressed opinion on the shield.
2003 invasion of Iraq: the Conservatives supported the United States over Iraq, while the other parties generally opposed it.
Gun registry: The Conservatives strongly opposed the gun registry while the other parties support it.
Marijuana: The Liberals have introduced measures to decriminalize possession of small quantities of marijuana, a move generally supported by the other opposition parties. The Conservative Party opposes such legislation. The Bloc Québécois is more explicit in its support for decriminalization, while the NDP wishes to study the issue and consider going beyond mere decriminalization.
Abortion: This was not a significant issue in this election. Abortion is legal in Canada after Parliament's failure to pass legislation to replace previous restrictions ruled illegal by the courts. Many Conservatives and a few Liberals oppose abortion. The Liberals tried to use it as a wedge issue after comments from pro-life Conservatives, but it did not change the outcome.
Ontario budget: The introduction by the Liberal government of Dalton McGuinty of "Ontario Health Premiums" was very unpopular, despite Mr. McGuinty's claim that this new tax was necessary because of the budgetary deficit left by the previous Progressive Conservative government. The Conservatives and the NDP capitalized on this and other unpopular fiscal and tax-related policy to attack the Liberals at the federal level.

Opinion polls

National results 

In 2004, a federal party required 155 of the 308 seats to form a majority government in Canada.  The Liberals came short of this number, winning 135. Until extremely close ridings were decided on the west coast, it appeared as though the Liberals' seat total, if combined with that of the left-wing New Democratic Party (NDP), would be sufficient to hold a majority in the House of Commons. In the end, the Conservatives won Vancouver Island North, West Vancouver-Sunshine Coast, and New Westminster-Coquitlam, after trailing in all three ridings, as preliminary results were announced through the evening.

As a result, the combined seat count of the Liberals and the NDP was 154, while the other 154 seats belonged to the Conservatives, Bloquistes, and one independent Chuck Cadman (previously a Conservative). Rather than forming a coalition with the NDP, the Liberal party led a minority government, obtaining majorities for its legislation on an ad hoc basis.  Nevertheless, as the showdown on Bill C-48, a matter of confidence, loomed in the spring of 2005, the Liberals and NDP, who wanted to continue the Parliament, found themselves matched against the Conservatives and the Bloc, who were registering no confidence. The bill passed with the Speaker casting the decisive tie-breaking vote.

Voter turnout nationwide was 60.9%, the lowest in Canadian history at that time, with 13,683,570 out of 22,466,621 registered voters casting their ballots. The voter turnout fell by more than 3pp from the 2000 federal election which had 64.1% turnout.

|- style="background-color:#CCCCCC"
!rowspan="2" colspan="2" style="text-align:left;" |Party
!rowspan="2" style="text-align:left;" |Party leader
!rowspan="2" style="text-align:center;" |# ofcandidates
!colspan="4" style="text-align:center;" |Seats
!colspan="3" style="text-align:center;"|Popular vote
|- style="background-color:#CCCCCC"
| style="text-align:center;" |2000
| style="text-align:center;" |Dissol.
| style="text-align:center;" |Elected
| style="text-align:center;" |% Change
| style="text-align:center;" |#
| style="text-align:center;" |%
| style="text-align:center;" |Change

| style="text-align:left;" |Paul Martin
| style="text-align:right;" |308
| style="text-align:right;" |172
| style="text-align:right;" |168
| style="text-align:right;" |135
| style="text-align:right;" |-21.5%
| style="text-align:right;" |4,982,220
| style="text-align:right;" |36.73%
| style="text-align:right;" |-4.12pp
1
| style="text-align:left;" |Stephen Harper
| style="text-align:right;" |308
| style="text-align:right;" |78
| style="text-align:right;" |72
| style="text-align:right;" |99
| style="text-align:right;" |+37.5%
| style="text-align:right;" |4,019,498
| style="text-align:right;" |29.63%
| style="text-align:right;" |-8.05pp

| style="text-align:left;" |Gilles Duceppe
| style="text-align:right;" |75
| style="text-align:right;" |38
| style="text-align:right;" |33
| style="text-align:right;" |54
| style="text-align:right;" |+42.1%
| style="text-align:right;" |1,680,109
| style="text-align:right;" |12.39%
| style="text-align:right;" |+1.67pp

| style="text-align:left;" |Jack Layton
| style="text-align:right;" |308
| style="text-align:right;" |13
| style="text-align:right;" |14
| style="text-align:right;" |19
| style="text-align:right;" |+46.2%
| style="text-align:right;" |2,127,403
| style="text-align:right;" |15.68%
| style="text-align:right;" |+7.17pp

| style="text-align:left;" colspan="2" |Independent and No Affiliation
| style="text-align:right;" |64
| style="text-align:right;" |-
| style="text-align:right;" |10
| style="text-align:right;" |1
| style="text-align:right;" |-
| style="text-align:right;" |64,864
| style="text-align:right;" |0.48%
| style="text-align:right;" |+0.05pp

| style="text-align:left;" |Jim Harris
| style="text-align:right;" |308
| style="text-align:right;" |-
| style="text-align:right;" |-
| style="text-align:right;" |-
| style="text-align:right;" |-
| style="text-align:right;" |582,247
| style="text-align:right;" |4.29%
| style="text-align:right;" |+3.48pp

| style="text-align:left;" |Ron Gray
| style="text-align:right;" |62
| style="text-align:right;" |*
| style="text-align:right;" |-
| style="text-align:right;" |-
| style="text-align:right;" |*
| style="text-align:right;" |40,335
| style="text-align:right;" |0.30%
| style="text-align:right;" |–

| style="text-align:left;" |Marc-Boris St-Maurice
| style="text-align:right;" |71
| style="text-align:right;" |-
| style="text-align:right;" |-
| style="text-align:right;" |-
| style="text-align:right;" |-
| style="text-align:right;" |33,276
| style="text-align:right;" |0.25%
| style="text-align:right;" |-0.27pp

| style="text-align:left;" |Ernie Schreiber
| style="text-align:right;" |16
| style="text-align:right;" |*
| style="text-align:right;" |-
| style="text-align:right;" |-
| style="text-align:right;" |*
| style="text-align:right;" |10,872
| style="text-align:right;" |0.08%
| style="text-align:right;" |*

| style="text-align:left;" |Connie Fogal
| style="text-align:right;" |44
| style="text-align:right;" |-
| style="text-align:right;" |-
| style="text-align:right;" |-
| style="text-align:right;" |-
| style="text-align:right;" |8,807
| style="text-align:right;" |0.06%
| style="text-align:right;" |-0.15pp

| style="text-align:left;" |Sandra L. Smith
| style="text-align:right;" |76
| style="text-align:right;" |-
| style="text-align:right;" |-
| style="text-align:right;" |-
| style="text-align:right;" |-
| style="text-align:right;" |8,696
| style="text-align:right;" |0.06%
| style="text-align:right;" |-0.03pp

| style="text-align:left;" |Miguel Figueroa
| style="text-align:right;" |35
| style="text-align:right;" |-
| style="text-align:right;" |-
| style="text-align:right;" |-
| style="text-align:right;" |-
| style="text-align:right;" |4,426
| style="text-align:right;" |0.03%
| style="text-align:right;" |-0.04pp

| style="text-align:left;" |Jean-Serge Brisson
| style="text-align:right;" |8
| style="text-align:right;" |*
| style="text-align:right;" |-
| style="text-align:right;" |-
| style="text-align:right;" |*
| style="text-align:right;" |1,949
| style="text-align:right;" |0.01%
| style="text-align:right;" |*
|-

| style="text-align:left;" colspan="4" |Vacant
| style="text-align:right;" |4
| style="text-align:center;" colspan="5" | 
|-
| style="text-align:left;" colspan="3" |Total
| style="text-align:right;" |1,683
| style="text-align:right;" |301
| style="text-align:right;" |301
| style="text-align:right;" |308
| style="text-align:right;" |+2.3%
| style="text-align:right;" |13,564,702
|colspan="2"|100%
|-
| style="text-align:left;" colspan="11" |Sources: Elections Canada Web Site -- History of Federal Ridings since 1867 
|-
|}Notes:

"% change" refers to change from previous election

* Party did not nominate candidates in the previous election.  In the case of the CHP, which did have 46 candidates in the previous election, the party did not have official status and is not officially compared.

1 Conservative Party results are compared to the combined totals of the Canadian Alliance and the Progressive Conservative Party in the 2000 election.

Vote and seat summaries

Results by province 

Source: Elections Canada

10 closest ridings 
 Western Arctic, NT: Ethel Blondin-Andrew (Lib) def. Dennis Bevington (NDP) by 53 votes
 Jeanne-Le Ber, QC: Liza Frulla (Lib) def. Thierry St-Cyr (BQ) by 72 votes
 Simcoe—Grey, ON: Helena Guergis (Cons) def. Paul Bonwick (Lib) by 100 votes
 New Westminster—Coquitlam, BC: Paul Forseth (Cons) def. Steve McClurg (NDP) by 113 votes
 Regina—Lumsden—Lake Centre, SK: Tom Lukiwski (Cons) def. Gary Anderson (Lib) by 122 votes
 Palliser, SK: Dave Batters (Cons) def. Dick Proctor (NDP) by 124 votes
 Edmonton—Beaumont, AB: David Kilgour (Lib) def. Tim Uppal (Cons) by 134 votes
 Cambridge, ON: Gary Goodyear (Cons) def. Janko Peric (Lib) by 224 votes
 Kildonan—St. Paul, MB: Joy Smith (Cons) def. Terry Duguid (Lib) by 278 votes
 Northumberland—Quinte West, ON: Paul Macklin (Lib) def. Doug Galt (Cons) by 313 votes

Allegations of coalition talks 
On March 26, 2011, Gilles Duceppe stated that Harper had tried to form a coalition government with the Bloc and NDP two months after the 2004 election. He was responding to Harper's warnings in 2011 that the Liberals might form a coalition with the Bloc and the NDP.

See also 

 Timeline of the 2004 Canadian federal election

Leadership elections of 2003 and 2004:
2004 Conservative Party of Canada leadership election
2003 Liberal Party of Canada leadership election
2003 Progressive Conservative leadership election
2003 New Democratic Party leadership election

Articles on parties' candidates in this election:

 Canadian Action
 Christian Heritage
 Communists
 Conservatives
 Green
 Independents
 Marijuana Party
 Marxist-Leninists
 New Democrats
 Progressive Canadians

Other articles:
List of Canadian federal general elections
List of elections in the Province of Canada (pre-Confederation)
Politics of Canada
List of political parties in Canada
Minority governments in Canada

References 
Notes

General

Further reading

External links 
 CBC – Canada Votes (includes video files of the whole English debate)
 CTV – Election 2004
 SRC – Élections (in French, includes video files of the whole French debate)
 Elections Canada
 Elections Canada official numbers
 Election Almanac – Canada Federal Election
 Predicting the 2004 Canadian Election
 International Delivery of Canadian Federal Election debate (Press Release issued by CTV and INSINC)

 
 Federal
June 2004 events in Canada